Prosper Balthazar Lyimo (born 20 August 1964 in Kyou-Kilema, Tanzania) is a Tanzanian clergyman and Roman Catholic auxiliary bishop in Arusha.

Biography
Lyimo received the sacrament of priestly ordination for the Archbishopric of Arusha on 4 July 1997. Until 1999, he was an educator at the Knusenseminar in Arusha. From 2000 to 2004 and from 2007 to 2008 he was chancellor of the archbishopric of Arusha.

In 2004 he went to Rome to study and earned his license in canon law at the Pontifical Urban University in 2007. After further studies from 2008 to 2011 at the Saint Paul University in Ottawa he became a Dr. jur. can. PhD. From 2011, he was once again chancellor and also an official of the Archdiocese of Arusha.

On 11 November 2014, Pope Francis appointed him as titular bishop of Vanariona and auxiliary bishop in Arusha. The archbishop of Arusha, Josaphat Louis Lebulu, gave him the bishop's ordination on 15 February of the following year. Co-Consecrators were the Apostolic Nuncio in Tanzania, Archbishop Francisco Montecillo Padilla, and the Bishop of Moshi, Isaac Amani Massawe.

References

1964 births
Living people
21st-century Roman Catholic titular bishops
Roman Catholic bishops of Arusha
Tanzanian Roman Catholic bishops